Chrysomantis royi is a species of praying mantis found in Kenya and Uganda.

See also
List of mantis genera and species

References

R
Mantodea of Africa
Insects of Kenya
Insects of Uganda
Insects described in 1987